Erik Bisgaard (25 January 1890 – 21 June 1987) was a Danish rower who competed in the 1912 Summer Olympics.

He was a crew member of the Danish boat, which won the bronze medal in the coxed fours. Erik Bisgaard later was to become a renowned ambassador for the sport of rowing in South America. Prior to the outbreak of the First World War Bisgaard left Denmark for Buenos Aires, Argentina, where he worked as an architect and engineer until his death in 1987. Erik Bisgaard's Great-Grandson is Roddy Bisgaard Lanigan who was a scholastic rowing champion in the United States.

In Buenos Aires, Erik became member of the Club Remeros Escandinavos (Scandinavian Rowing Club) in Tigre. This club was founded only a few years before Erik migrated to Argentina, in 1912, coincidently the same year Erik participated of the Stokholm Summer Olympics and obtained his bronze medal.

Erik was an advanced lightweight sculler in an era where sweep rowing was exponentially more popular. However he managed to position himself among the best of his time winning a good deal of regattas between 1914 and the 1920s.

References

External links 
 profile

1890 births
1987 deaths
Danish male rowers
Rowers at the 1912 Summer Olympics
Olympic rowers of Denmark
Olympic bronze medalists for Denmark
Olympic medalists in rowing
Medalists at the 1912 Summer Olympics